Chowdown Countdown is an American television special series that features 101 places to find the tastiest and most amazing food at various locations across America. Each episode counts down to the number one spot and features all different types of establishments such as restaurants, diners, drive-ins, bars, burger joints, bakeries, drivethrus, delicatessens, ice cream parlors, pubs, sandwich shops, food markets and even food trucks that make the countdown list with their original food specialty or signature dish.

The series premiered as a special in Spring 2010 entitled 101 America's Tastiest Places to Chowdown on the Travel Channel. The second special aired in on March 16, 2014 as 101 More Amazing Places to Chowdown (or Chowdown Countdown 2).

America's 101 Tastiest Places to Chowdown (2010)

Episode 1: #101-81

Episode 2: #80-61

Episode 3 #60-41

Episode 4 #40-21

Episode 5 #20-1

101 More Amazing Places to Chowdown (2014)
Note: This special was also nicknamed, "Chowdown Countdown 2".

Episode 1 #101-81

Episode 2 #80-61

Episode 3 #60-41

Episode 4 #40-21

Episode 5 #20-1

References

External links
 101 America's Tastiest Places to Chowdown @ Travelchannel.com
 101 More Amazing Places to Chowdown @ Travel Channel

2010 American television series endings
2010 American television series debuts
American travel television series
Travel Channel original programming